Brian Turner (born 1967) is an American poet, essayist, and professor. He won the 2005 Beatrice Hawley Award for his debut collection, Here, Bullet (Alice James Books) the first of many awards and honors received for this collection of poems about his experience as a soldier in the Iraq War. His honors since include a Lannan Literary Fellowship and NEA Literature Fellowship in Poetry, and the Amy Lowell Poetry Travelling Scholarship. His second collection, shortlisted for the 2010 T.S. Eliot Prize is Phantom Noise (Alice James Books, USA; Bloodaxe Books, UK, 2010).

Early life and education
Turner was born in Visalia, California, and raised in Fresno and then Madera County through high school and attended Fresno City College before transferring to Fresno State for his BA and MA. He received his MFA from the University of Oregon. He taught English in South Korea for a year, and traveled to Russia, the United Arab Emirates, and Japan.

Military service
Turner is a United States Army veteran, and was an infantry team leader for a year in the Iraq War beginning November 2003, with the 3rd Stryker Brigade Combat Team, 2nd Infantry Division. In 1999 and 2000 he was with the 10th Mountain Division, deployed in Bosnia and Herzegovina.

Career
Turner has seen his poems published in The Cortland Review, Poetry Daily, Atlanta Review, Crab Orchard Review, Georgia Review, Rattle, Virginia Quarterly Review, and ZYZZYVA, and in anthologies including Voices in Wartime: The Anthology (Whit Press, 2005) and Operation Homecoming: Iraq, Afghanistan, and the Home Front, in the Words of U.S. Troops and Their Families (Random House, 2006). His published essays include one for National Geographic and a series of essays for The New York Times blog, Home Fires.

Turner received major media attention for Here, Bullet, interviewed or featured in The New Yorker, The New York Times, on The NewsHour with Jim Lehrer, on Morning Edition and other NPR programs, The Verb (BBC), and many other venues. He was featured in the film, Operation Homecoming: Writing the Wartime Experience, nominated for a 2007 Academy Award for Best Documentary. Bloodaxe Books published the U.K. edition of Here, Bullet in 2007 His works have been included in such anthologies as  The Best American Poetry 2007 and A mind apart: poems of melancholy, madness, and addiction. 

Texts by Turner are the basis of the large-scale musical composition Dreams of the Fallen by Jake Runestad, first performed at The National WWII Museum in New Orleans on Veterans Day, 11 November 2013.

Books
 Here, Bullet, Alice James Books, 2005, ; Bloodaxe Books, UK, 2007, .
 Phantom Noise, Alice James Books, 2010, ; Bloodaxe Books, UK, 2010, .
 My Life as a Foreign Country: A Memoir, 2014; W. W. Norton & Company 
 The Kiss: Intimacies from Writers, 2018, (editor); W. W. Norton & Company

Honors and awards
 2016: 2016 Guggenheim Fellowship in Poetry
 2012: JUSFC Japan-US Friendship Commission Fellowship
 2009: 2009 Fellow Award from United States Artists
 2009: Amy Lowell Poetry Travelling Scholarship
 2008: 2008 Charity Randall Citation
 2007: NEA Literature Fellowship in Poetry
 2007: Poets' Prize for Here Bullet
 2006: Maine Literary Award in Poetry
 2006: Northern California Book Award in Poetry
 2006: PEN Center USA "Best in the West" Literary Award in Poetry
 2006: Sheila Margaret Motten Award from the New England Poetry Club
 2006: Lannan Literary Fellowship
 2005: Beatrice Hawley Award

Personal life
Turner married fellow poet Ilyse Kusnetz (1966-2016) in 2010. He created an album titled 11 11 (Me Smiling) using lines from her poetry, in some instances in her own voice, from tapes of her readings, and others, him reading from her poems.

References

Further reading
Goodyear, Dana. "Ink: War Poet" (Talk of the Town). The New Yorker. November 14, 2005. pg. 39.
Outside the Wire: American Soldiers' Voices from Afghanistan, Christine Dumaine Leche (Editor), Brian Turner (Foreword)

External links

Guernica: A Magazine of Art and Politics: "Poetry's Urban Landscape"
Poetry Blog: Brian Turner's Poetry Journal at the Poetry Foundation
Video: Brian Turner Reading at the Santa Cruz Bookshop
Alice James Books > Interview with Brian Turner
New York Foundation for the Arts > Interview with Brian Turner
Audio: Brian Turner Reading for Fishousepoems.org
Brian Turner Author Page > Alice James Books Website
 Lannan Foundation - Interview: Brian Turner and Bruce Weigl with Michael Silverblatt
 Blue Flower Arts > Author's Booking Agency
"A Conversation with Brian Turner", Virginia Quarterly Review, 08-27-2008
"Stories from the Suck: The First Wave of Iraq War Narratives", Stacey Peebles, Berfrois, 04-15-2011

Reviews

1967 births
Living people
American male poets
American essayists
Educators from Nevada
Writers from Fresno, California
University of Oregon alumni
Fresno City College alumni
Sierra Nevada College
California State University, Fresno alumni
National Endowment for the Arts Fellows
United States Army personnel of the Iraq War
American male essayists
War poets
People from Fresno, California
United States Army soldiers
21st-century American poets
21st-century American male writers